Michael St. Gerard (born January 22, 1961) is an American former actor and pastor.

Career

Early work
St. Gerard started by appearing in Japanese commercials and Off-Broadway shows. His first movie was 1987’s Senior Week. He is most recognized for his role as 'Link' in John Waters’s Hairspray (1988).

As Elvis
In 1989 he starred in two movies in which he portrayed Elvis Presley: Heart of Dixie and Great Balls of Fire!. His portrayal of Elvis in both films led him to being cast a third time as young Elvis in the 1990 TV series Elvis, appearing in all ten episodes. He also appeared in 1993 as Elvis's mirror image in the penultimate episode of Quantum Leap titled "Memphis Melody."

Later acting work
He later appeared as an acting teacher in the second season of Beverly Hills, 90210. He then made a few direct-to-video films. These included Into the Sun (1992), Live Wire, and Replikator (1994)

Retirement from acting
In 1994, St. Gerard had a spiritual awakening after leading a Sunday School class, and, with it, decided to retire from acting at age 33 and focus his energies on religious instruction. He subsequently became a pastor in the Harlem area of New York City, extending himself and his church in particular to inner-city youths, and spends little time reflecting on his past stardom. As of 2014, he was still working as a pastor at the Harlem Square Church.

Filmography

References

External links
 

American male actors
1961 births
Living people
People from New York Mills, New York
People from Harlem
Elvis impersonators